Brookula densilaminata is a species of sea snail, a marine gastropod mollusk, unassigned in the superfamily Seguenzioidea.

Distribution
The height of the shell attains 5 mm.

Distribution
This marine species occurs off Australia.

References

External links
 To World Register of Marine Species
 

densilaminata
Gastropods described in 1907